The Chevrolet Parkwood was a station wagon built by Chevrolet from 1959 to 1961. As the station wagon equivalent of the Bel Air passenger car series, it represented the middle member of the Chevrolet station wagon lineup of those years, above the lowest-priced Brookwood models, but below the luxury-leader Nomad.

1959-1960

All 1959 and 1960 Parkwoods were six-passenger models, whereas the Kingswood (Chevrolet's other Bel Air equivalent during those two years), had seating for nine. The Parkwood became available in both passenger configurations for 1961, when the Kingswood name was dropped. (The latter name returned for 1969.) The Parkwood name was also dropped for 1962, when all Chevrolet station wagons began sharing series names with their passenger-car linemates. Throughout its three-year production run, the Parkwood was available with either a six-cylinder or V8 engine.

1961

For 1961, Chevrolet again had a totally new body, not just new sheetmetal.
The V8 cost $110 more than the Six and weighed  less. GM discontinued the Chevrolet Parkwood name for 1962, instead naming their station wagons after their series names: Biscayne, Bel Air and Impala.

Safety
Chevrolet's 1961 Parkwood (as well as all other full size Chevrolets) featured a shortened version of Chevrolet's "Safety-Girder" cruciform frame introduced in '58. Similar in layout to the frame adopted for the 1957 Cadillac, it featured box-section side rails and a boxed front cross member that bowed under the engine, these "x-frames" were used on other 1958 to 1964 Chevys, as well as Cadillac. The rear was tied together by a channel-section cross member. This design was later criticized as providing less protection in the event of a side impact collision, but would persevere until 1965.

Chevrolet Parkwood Discontinuation and Replacement
GM discontinued the Chevrolet Parkwood wagon nameplate (as well as the Brookwood and Nomad wagon names) for 1962, instead naming their station wagons after their series names: Biscayne (replacing Brookwood directly), Bel Air and Impala. The 1962-'64 Biscayne, Bel Air, and Impala wagons were very similar to Chevy's 1961 wagon models.

Notes

Parkwood
Station wagons
1960s cars
Cars introduced in 1959
Rear-wheel-drive vehicles
Motor vehicles manufactured in the United States